Agastache scrophulariifolia, also known as the purple giant hyssop, is a perennial plant that grows throughout the US and Northern Ontario, CN. Its name comes from the similarity of its leaves to plants of the genus Scrophularia. It is a beneficial plant to pollinators and is noted for its medicinal properties, as many plants in the mint family are. It tends to grow in disturbed or open areas where it does not have to interact with non-native competitive plants.

Description
Individuals of this species are perennial herbs that can grow up to six feet tall. They are late-flowering species in the mint family. Agastache scrophulariifolia tends to have several spiked inflorescence. Flowers of Agastache scrophulariifolia do not all bloom simultaneously and range from lavender to pink in color. The dark brown fruit they produce is a nutlet.

Distribution
Agastache scrophulariifolia   was once distributed throughout CT, DC, DE, GA, IA, IL, IN, KS, KY, MA, MD, MI, MN, MO, NC, NE, NH, NJ, NY, OH, PA, SC, SD, TN, VA, VT, WI, WV, and ON, Canada. However, its range is now severely reduced in many areas and in some cases extirpated completely. These declines are largely due to habitat loss, predation by deer, and competition for resources with non-native plants.

Conservation status in the United States
It is listed as endangered in Connecticut and Massachusetts, as threatened in Maryland and Vermont, and as a special concern in Kentucky and Tennessee.

Habitat and ecology
Agastache scrophulariifolia tends to grow in riparian habitats, disturbed open areas, and meadows. The previously mentioned areas are ideal for Agastache scrophulariifolia because competition with other plants is reduced. As riparian habitats are altered or farmlands return to forest communities, Agastache scrophulariifolia  suffers from habitat loss. It is a perennial plant that grows well in sandy loamy soils and requires sunlight for its seeds to germinate.

Usage 
Many people use this plant for its aromatic effects. Its leaves are edible.  In many cases, herbal and landscape plants identified as A. scrophulariifolia are actually A. foeniculum and A. rugosa.

Medicinal
The Meskwaki use an infusion of the root as a diuretic, and also use a compound of the plant heads medicinally.

Notes

References

Plants Profile for Agastache scrophulariifolia (Purple giant hyssop). Plants Profile for Agastache scrophulariifolia (Purple giant hyssop). Retrieved May 5, 2014, from http://plants.usda.gov/core/profile?symbol=AGSC

PURPLE GIANT HYSSOP Agastache scrophulariifolia (Willd.) Kuntze. Retrieved May 5, 2014, from https://plants.usda.gov/plantguide/pdf/pg_agsc.pdf

scrophulariifolia
Flora of the United States
Taxa named by Carl Ludwig Willdenow
Plants used in traditional Native American medicine